This is a list of members of the Australian Senate from 1965 to 1968. Half of its members were elected at the 9 December 1961 election and had terms starting on 1 July 1962 and finishing on 30 June 1968; the other half were elected at the 5 December 1964 half Senate election and had terms starting on 1 July 1965 and finishing on 30 June 1971.  The process for filling casual vacancies was complex. While senators were elected for a six-year term, people appointed to a casual vacancy only held office until the earlier of the next election for the House of Representatives or the Senate.

Notes

References

Members of Australian parliaments by term
20th-century Australian politicians
Australian Senate lists